Nebesnaya komanda is a 2021 Russian-Belarusian drama film directed by Vladimir Alenikov. It was theatrically released on September 9, 2021.

Plot 
The film tells about the fans of the Lokomotiv Yaroslavl ice hockey club, who go to Minsk to support their favorite team. This trip will change their lives and the sports world forever.

Cast

References 

2021 films
2020s Russian-language films
Russian drama films
Belarusian drama films